The Secretary-General to the President is the highest-ranking official in the Office of the President, Republic of China, and supervises the staff of the Office. The current Secretary-General is Lin Chia-lung.

Duties
According to Article 9 of the Office of the President Organization Act, "The Office of the President shall have one secretary-general to the president. The secretary-general shall be a special-grade political appointee and shall, under the direction of the president, take overall charge of the affairs of the Office of the President and direct and supervise all staff."

Deputy Secretaries-General
The Secretary-General is assisted by two Deputy Secretaries-General. The current Deputy Secretaries-General are Liu Chien-sin and Yao Jen-to.

List of Secretaries-General

See also 

 President of the Republic of China
 Office of the President (Taiwan)
 Presidential Office Building

References

External links
 Office of the President, ROC (Taiwan)

T